Canaris is a 1954 West German drama film directed by Alfred Weidenmann and starring O. E. Hasse, Barbara Rütting and Adrian Hoven. It portrays real events during the Second World War when Wilhelm Canaris the head of German military intelligence was arrested and executed for his involvement with the 20 July Plot to overthrow Adolf Hitler. The film was a major success at the German box office, possibly because it allowed audiences to identify with a heroic German figure disassociated from Nazism. Released in the UK as Canaris Master Spy, and in the US as Deadly Decision—it is also known by the alternative title Canaris: Master Spy.

It was shot at the Tempelhof Studios in Berlin.

Main cast

Music
The soundtrack features music from Lohengrin, composed by Richard Wagner.

Release
Canaris opened in Hanover on 30 December 1954. The distributor played down any political significance to the film, and marketed it as the story of a good German Christian "whose human tragedy reflects the experience of millions of Germans."

Reception
The film was generally well received by critics, the press, and the public. It was recognized by the FBW as "especially valuable", and was awarded a Bambi for being the most financially successful film of 1955.

The film's portrayal of a "tragic hero" of the Nazi period has been described as part of the beginning of a wave of films "interrogating the National Socialist past" in West German cinemas.

References

External links

1954 films
1950s biographical drama films
1950s spy drama films
Films about Nazi Germany
Films about the 20 July plot
Films directed by Alfred Weidenmann
Films set in Germany
Films set in Berlin
Films set in London
Films set in Vienna
World War II spy films
German biographical drama films
1950s German-language films
German spy drama films
West German films
Films shot at Tempelhof Studios
German war drama films
1954 drama films
German black-and-white films
1950s German films